Bavšica is a dispersed settlement in the Municipality of Bovec in the Littoral region of Slovenia.

Geography
Bavšica lies in a glacial valley below Mount Bavšica Grintovec in the Julian Alps to the east and the Log Cliff to the north. The valley also hosts the Bavšica Hiking Training Center (PUS Bavšica), the main educational center of the Alpine Association of Slovenia.

Name
Bavšica was attested in written sources in 1763–87 as Bauschiza. The name is derived from the Slovene common noun balha (dialect baha) 'matgrass', referring to the local vegetation. A less likely explanation is that the name is derived from the adjective *balh 'whitish, pale'.

References

External links
 Bavšica on Geopedia

Populated places in the Municipality of Bovec